The Key Biodiversity Areas (KBA) approach helps to identify and designate areas of international importance in terms of biodiversity conservation using globally standardised criteria. KBAs extend the Important Bird Area (IBA) concept to other taxonomic groups and are now being identified in many parts of the world, by a range of organisations. Examples include Important Plant Areas (IPAs), Ecologically and Biologically Significant Areas (EBSAs) in the High Seas, Alliance for Zero Extinction (AZE) sites, Prime Butterfly Areas, Important Mammal Areas and Important Sites for Freshwater Biodiversity, with prototype criteria developed for freshwater molluscs and fish and for marine systems. The determination of KBAs often brings sites onto the conservation agenda that hadn't previously been identified as needing protection due to the nature of the two non-exclusive criteria used to determine them; vulnerability; and irreplaceability.

The KBA global standard  was published in 2016.

Objectives 

 Develop technical and conservation capacity within individual countries and on a global scale
 Develop partnerships between key organisations – both governmental and nongovernmental – concerned with site conservation
 Build broad understanding of the process, and broad ownership of the final site list
 Focus any new survey work on the most important gaps in knowledge

See also 
 Conservation biology
 Ecoregions
 Biodiversity
 Crisis Ecoregions
 High conservation value area
 High-Biodiversity Wilderness Areas
 Biodiversity Hotspots
 Biosphere Reserves
 Site-based conservation
 Protected Areas

References

External links
 A-Z of Areas of Biodiversity Importance: Key Biodiversity Areas (KBA)

Biodiversity
Ecoregions